Belligobio is a small genus of cyprinid fishes containing two recognized species endemic to China. The type species of Belligobio is Belligobio eristigma, a synonym of Hemibarbus mylodon, and this taxa is not currently classified in Belligobio and some authorities suggest that Belligobio is a sub-genus within Hemibarbus.

Species
 Belligobio nummifer (Boulenger, 1901)
 Belligobio pengxianensis P.Q. Luo, Le & Yi-Yu Chen, 1977

References

 

 
Taxa named by David Starr Jordan
Cyprinid fish of Asia
Freshwater fish of China
Cyprinidae genera